Bolitophagus is a genus of beetles belonging to the family Tenebrionidae.

The genus was first described by Illiger in 1798.

The species of this genus are found in Eurasia and Northern America.

Species:
 Bolitophagus reticulatus (Linnaeus, 1767)

References

Tenebrionidae